The 2004 Chinese Super League Cup (Chinese: 2004中国足球协会超级联赛杯) was the first edition of Chinese Super League Cup. Shandong Luneng Taishan won the title after beating Shenzhen Jianlibao 2–0 in the final.

Results

First round

First leg

Second leg

 Shenyang Ginde abdicated to play at their home stadium.

Second round

First leg

Second leg

Semi-finals

First leg

Second leg

Final

See also
2004 Chinese FA Cup

References

2004 in Chinese football
2004 domestic association football cups